Kelvin Ruben Maynard (29 May 1987 – 18 September 2019) was a Surinamese professional footballer who played as a right defender.

Career
Born in Paramaribo, Suriname, Maynard made his professional debuts with FC Volendam, playing in four second division games in the 2006–07 season. He contributed with 35 appearances in his second year as the club promoted to Eredivisie.

Maynard made his top flight debut on 31 August 2008, in a 2–3 home loss against SC Heerenveen. The Other Oranje were eventually relegated back, after finishing in 18th position. In the 2010 off-season, he signed with S.C. Olhanense in Portugal, but his input with the Algarve outfit consisted of three League Cup games (three losses, including the 2–3 at S.L. Benfica).

On 5 July 2011, Maynard moved clubs and countries again, joining Kecskeméti TE in Hungary. He was released in December.

Maynard signed for English club Burton Albion in November 2014 until the end of the 2014–15 season. He extended his contract in July 2015. He was injured in August 2015, and ruled out for the 2015–16 season.

Death
Maynard was shot and killed on 18 September 2019 in Amsterdam. He attempted to escape gunmen by driving towards a fire station in the area, but his car hit the building, and he was unable to be resuscitated by local firemen and medics.

He left a wife and a child of eight years.

Personal life
Maynard's brother, Dehninio Muringen, is also a professional footballer.

Honours
FC Volendam
 Eerste Divisie: 2007–08

Burton Albion
 Football League Two: 2014–15

References

External links
 Stats at Voetbal International 
 Profile at HLSZ 
 

1987 births
2019 deaths
Sportspeople from Paramaribo
Surinamese footballers
Dutch footballers
Surinamese emigrants to the Netherlands
Association football defenders
Eredivisie players
Eerste Divisie players
A.V.V. Zeeburgia players
FC Volendam players
S.C. Olhanense players
Kecskeméti TE players
FC Emmen players
Royal Antwerp F.C. players
Burton Albion F.C. players
English Football League players
Dutch expatriate footballers
Expatriate footballers in Portugal
Expatriate footballers in Hungary
Expatriate footballers in England
Dutch expatriate sportspeople in Portugal
Dutch expatriate sportspeople in Hungary
Dutch expatriate sportspeople in England
Deaths by firearm in the Netherlands
Surinamese murder victims
Dutch murder victims
Male murder victims